The Flyway Byway is a Louisiana Scenic Byway that follows several different state highways:
LA 14 from south of Hayes to Lake Arthur;
LA 26 from Lake Arthur to Jennings;
LA 99 from west of Lake Arthur to Welsh;
LA 3056 from west of Lake Arthur to the Lacassine National Wildlife Refuge; and
US 90 from Welsh to Jennings.

References

Louisiana Scenic Byways
Tourist attractions in Cameron Parish, Louisiana
Tourist attractions in Jefferson Davis Parish, Louisiana
Scenic highways in Louisiana
U.S. Route 90